Tillandsia hegeri is a species in the genus Tillandsia. This species is endemic to Bolivia.

References

hegeri
Flora of Bolivia